Khushal Khan Khattak University Karak is a public sector university situated in Karak, Khyber Pakhtunkhwa Pakistan.

Overview and History 
Khushal Khan Khattak University Karak was established by then ANP led provincial government of Khyber Pakhtunkhwa in October 2012. The Higher Education Commission (HEC) issued the No Objection Certificate (NOC) to the university vide notification no. 15-27/HEC/A&A/2013/1361.

The university is named after famous Pashtoon warrior and poet Khushal Khan Khattak. In May 2017, KPOGCL starts the company's chair in the university in order to establish close liaison with the academia for which Memorandum of Understanding (MoU) was signed in 2016.

Departments 
The university has the following departments as of 2017.

 Department of Education and Research
 Department of Computer Science and Bioinformatics
 Department of Management Sciences
 Department of Communication & Media Studies

 Department of English
 Department of Library & Information Science
 Department of Material Physics and Nanotechnology
 Department of Geology

Programs & Courses 
The university currently offers the following degree programs and courses.

Undergraduate
 BS Computer Science
 BS Bioinformatics
 BS Physics
 BS Nanotechnology
 BS Geology
 BS English
 BS Library & Information Sciences
 BS Communication & Media Studies
 BBA (Honors)

Post Graduate
 MA Communication & Media Studies
 MA Library & Information Sciences
 M.Ed
 MS Management Sciences
 M.Phil Education

Doctoral
 PhD Management Sciences

See also
 Government Post Graduate College Karak
 Kohat University of Science and Technology
 University of Science and Technology Bannu
 Universities in Pakistan

References

Public universities and colleges in Khyber Pakhtunkhwa
2012 establishments in Pakistan
Educational institutions established in 2012
Karak District